William George Muir (February 1, 1895 – January 5, 1967) was an American football, basketball, and baseball coach.  He served as the head football coach at Northern Illinois University from 1925 to 1925, compiling a record of 11–9–3. Muir was also the head basketball coach at Northern Illinois from 1923 to 1926 and the head baseball coach at the school from 1924 to 1926. He graduated from the University of Missouri and also attended coaching school at the University of Illinois. Prior to coming to Northern Illinois, he had taught and coached in Kansas, Texas, and in Decatur, Illinois.

Head coaching record

Football

References

External links
 

1895 births
1967 deaths
American football guards
Basketball coaches from Nebraska
Missouri Tigers football players
Northern Illinois Huskies athletic directors
Northern Illinois Huskies baseball coaches
Northern Illinois Huskies football coaches
Northern Illinois Huskies men's basketball coaches
People from Nemaha County, Nebraska